Nine Objects of Desire is the fifth studio album by American musician Suzanne Vega, released on September 10, 1996 through A&M Records. As with her previous album 99.9F° (1992), it was produced by her then-husband Mitchell Froom (who also co-wrote three tracks).

Much like its predecessor, Nine Objects of Desire integrates experimental instrumentation and arrangements into Vega's signature sound. Additionally, elements of jazz are present on tracks such as "Caramel" and "Tombstone". High-profile contributors to the album include Tchad Blake on guitar, Jerry Marotta on drums, and members of Elvis Costello's backing band the Attractions.

Nine Objects of Desire peaked at number 92 in the US, continuing a downward trend in Vega's album sales throughout the 1990s. However, it received positive reviews from critics, many of whom praised the songwriting and production, and spawned a UK top 40 hit in "No Cheap Thrill".

Music and lyrics

Nine Objects of Desire features experimental production and arrangements, though to a lesser extent than its predecessor. Driven by what Vega described as "sensual" rhythms, the album incorporates elements of bossa nova and alternative rock. Lyrically, the album takes a more personal turn in comparison to Vega's other albums, forgoing character pieces and instead taking heavy inspiration from Vega's personal life.

"Birth-day (Love Made Real)" refers to the birth of Vega's daughter Ruby. "Caramel" was heavily influenced by bossa nova, particularly the music of Astrud Gilberto. The lyrics were inspired by a passing crush on a friend, and was arranged to have an "Antônio Carlos Jobim feel". Vega has stated it is one of the songs she is most proud of.

Track listing

Personnel
 Suzanne Vega – vocals, guitar
 Mitchell Froom – keyboards, Moog bass, string & horn arrangements
 Tchad Blake – guitar, whistle, effects, mixing
 Steve Donnelly – guitar
 Dave Douglas – trumpet
 Don Byron – clarinet
 Jane Scarpantoni – cello
 Mark Feldman – strings
 Sebastian Steinberg – bass
 Bruce Thomas – bass
 Yuval Gabay – drums
 Jerry Marotta – drums, percussion
 Pete Thomas – drums, drum loop, percussion

Charts

References

1996 albums
Suzanne Vega albums
Albums produced by Mitchell Froom
A&M Records albums